Caiazzo is a station on Line 2 of the Milan Metro. It was opened on 27 September 1969 as part of the inaugural section of Line 2, between Cascina Gobba and Caiazzo. On 27 April 1970, the line was extended by one station to Centrale.

References

External links

Line 2 (Milan Metro) stations
Railway stations opened in 1969
1969 establishments in Italy
Railway stations in Italy opened in the 20th century